Controguerra (Abruzzese:) is a town and comune in Teramo province in the Abruzzo region of central Italy.

Controguerra DOC
Controguerra is noted for the Italian DOC wine produced in the hills and a valley near the comune. The area produces a wide variety of wine styles including, red, white, passito and spumante. Grape harvest are limited to yields of 14 tonnes/ha. The red wines of Controguerra are made predominantly of Montepulciano (at least 60%) with Merlot, Cabernet Franc and Cabernet Sauvignon permitted up to 15% of the blend and other local varieties permitted up to 25%. Whites wines are composed of 60% Trebbiano and at least 15% Passerina with other local varieties permitted up to 25%. Sparkling Spumante wines are composed of at least 60% Trebbiano, at least 30% blend of Chardonnay, Verdicchio and Pecorino with other varieties permitted up to 10%. Finished red wines are required to have at least 12% alcohol and finished whites a minimum of 11%.

See also
List of Italian DOC wines
Abruzzo (wine)

References

External links
Official website

Cities and towns in Abruzzo